Curling at the 2002 Winter Olympics took place from February 11 to February 18 in Ogden, Utah. The 2002 Winter Games were the third time that curling was on the Olympic program.

Men's

Men's tournament

Teams

* Hammy McMillan was replaced by Warwick Smith as skip after Draw 4.

Final standings

Draws

Draw 1
February 11, 9:00

Draw 2
February 11, 19:00

Draw 3
February 12, 14:00

Draw 4
February 13, 9:00

Draw 5
February 13, 19:00

Draw 6
February 14, 14:00

Draw 7
February 15, 9:00

Draw 8
February 15, 19:00

Draw 9
February 16, 14:00

Draw 10
February 17, 9:00

Draw 11
February 17, 19:00

Draw 12
February 18, 14:00

Medal round

Semifinals
February 20, 14:00

Bronze medal game
February 21, 9:00

Gold medal game
February 22, 14:30

Top 5 player percentages

Women's

Women's tournament

Teams

Final standings

Draws

Draw 1
February 11, 14:00

Draw 2
February 12, 9:00

Draw 3
February 12, 19:00

Draw 4
February 13, 14:00

Draw 5
February 14, 9:00

Draw 6
February 14, 19:00

Draw 7
February 15, 14:00

Draw 8
February 16, 9:00

Draw 9
February 16, 19:00

Draw 10
February 17, 14:00

Draw 11
February 18, 9:00

Draw 12
February 18, 19:00

Tiebreaker 1
February 19, 9:00

Tiebreaker 2
February 19, 14:00

Medal round

Semifinals
February 20, 9:00

Bronze medal game
February 21, 9:00

Gold medal game
February 21, 14:00

Top 5 player percentages

References

External links
Official Results Book – Curling

 
2002 Winter Olympics events
2002
2002 in curling
International curling competitions hosted by the United States
Curling competitions in Utah
Sports competitions in Ogden, Utah